Eupsophus migueli is a species of frog in the family Alsodidae.
It is endemic to Chile.
Its natural habitats are temperate forest and intermittent freshwater marshes.
It is threatened by habitat loss.

Description
Eupsophus migueli contains a yellow tint in the iris. Along with a wine pigment skin with white blotches.

References

Eupsophus
Amphibians of Chile
Endemic fauna of Chile
Amphibians of Patagonia
Taxonomy articles created by Polbot
Amphibians described in 1978